"Forever Love" is the thirteenth single by Japanese recording artist Alisa Mizuki. It was released on April 23, 1997 as the fourth single from Mizuki's third compilation album Fiore II. The song was used in commercials for Kafeo canned coffee by Asahi Soft Drinks. "Forever Love" is Mizuki's last single released under Nippon Columbia. The single also marks the first release to credit Mizuki as Alisa Mizuki, rather than Arisa Mizuki.

Chart performance 
"Forever Love" debuted on the Oricon Weekly Singles chart at number 35 with 11,600 copies sold in its first week. The single charted for three weeks and has sold a total of 21,710 copies.

Track listing

Charts and sales

References 

1997 singles
Alisa Mizuki songs
1997 songs
Songs with lyrics by Hiromasa Ijichi